Segezhsky District is an administrative district (raion), one of the fifteen in the Republic of Karelia, Russia. It is located in the east of the republic. Its administrative center is the town of Segezha. As of the 2010 Census, the total population of the district was 41,215, with the population of Segezha accounting for 71.9% of that number.

Administrative and municipal status
Within the framework of administrative divisions, Segezhsky District is one of the fifteen in the Republic of Karelia and has administrative jurisdiction over one town (Segezha), one urban-type settlement (Nadvoitsy), and thirty-four rural localities. As a municipal division, the district is incorporated as Segezhsky Municipal District. The town, the urban-type settlement, and six rural localities are incorporated into two urban settlements, while the remaining twenty-eight rural localities are incorporated into four rural settlements within the municipal district. The town of Segezha serves as the administrative center of both the administrative and municipal district.

References

Notes

Sources

Districts of the Republic of Karelia
 
